Woodcock Airport  is an abandoned airstrip located  northeast of Cedarvale, British Columbia, Canada.

Built in the 1940s by the RCAF as a detachment of RCAF Air Station Smithers, the airstrip was briefly maintained as an emergency airstrip after the end of WWII.

In 1969, the Terrace Skydiving Club took over maintenance and used it until 2004, when the club re-located to Beaverley Airport. The runway had been overgrown by vegetation until May 2019, when the BC General Aviation association staged a cleanup event.

Media appearances

The airstrip featured in episode 6 of LoadingReadyRun's Road Quest.

References

Registered aerodromes in British Columbia
Regional District of Kitimat–Stikine